Hydriomena divisaria, the black-dashed hydriomena moth, is a moth in the family Geometridae. It is found in North America, where it has been recorded from southern Canada and the northern United States, south to Georgia in the east.

The wingspan is 24–30 mm. The forewings are greyish-brown with a variable pattern of scalloped blackish lines. The greyish band in the antemedial area usually reaches the costa and the terminal line usually consists of a blurred pair dots. Adults have been recorded on wing mainly in April to July.

The larvae feed on Abies balsamea, Pinus and Picea species.

Subspecies
Hydriomena divisaria divisaria
Hydriomena divisaria brunnescens McDunnough, 1954
Hydriomena divisaria frigidata (Walker, 1863)

References

Moths described in 1860
Hydriomenini